Beijing Automotive Group Co., Ltd. (BAIC) is a Chinese state-owned automobile manufacturer headquartered in Shunyi, Beijing. Founded in 1958, it is the sixth largest automobile manufacturer in China, with 1.723 million sales in 2021.

The company produces and sells vehicles under its own branding, such as Arcfox, Beijing, BAW, Changhe, Foton Motor, Ruili Doda,  as well as under foreign-branded joint ventures such as Beijing-Benz and Beijing-Hyundai. It also produces electric vehicles under some of the previously listed brandings, including dedicated EV brands such as Arcfox. Its principal subsidiaries include the passenger car maker BAIC Motor (44.98% share); military vehicle and light truck maker BAW; and truck, bus, and agricultural equipment maker, Foton Motor. A large proportion of sales BAIC's sales is in agricultural, commercial, and military vehicles.

History
BAIC was originally founded in 1958 as Beijing Automobile Works (BAW), which found success producing the Dongfanghong BJ760, a vehicle based on the Soviet GAZ-21.

BAIC was one of the top ten most-productive Chinese automakers in 2010. This may be due to subsidiary Beijing Automobile Works and a sustained surge of popularity for Beijing Hyundai products. It reached fifth place by selling nearly 1.5 millions units garnering a market share of more than 8%. 2011 production of 1.5 million whole vehicles made BAIC the fifth largest vehicle-maker in China that year in terms of units manufactured. BAIC remained fifth in 2012, which saw the company make 1.7 million whole vehicles; 30% of production was commercial or heavy-duty products.

Saab technology transfer
After several unsuccessful attempts to buy struggling European automakers in 2009, such as Saab, Volvo, and Opel as well as technology from the American Chrysler, BAIC fulfilled its aim of obtaining valuable Western technology that same year purchasing technology from a former unit of General Motors, Saab Automobile. This allows it to produce older Saab models (but not brand them as Saabs) for sale in China.

The intellectual property bought by BAIC includes the rights to three overall vehicle platforms, Saab 9-3 and Saab 9-5 technologies, two engine technologies, and two transmission systems.

Cars with Saab technology were expected to go on sale in 2012 but didn't debut until May 2013. The first Saab-based model on sale is the C70 or 绅宝 (Shenbao), which may be translated as "gentleman's treasure".

Brands
BAIC has a wide product line that includes more than the buses that are its traditional manufacture. Offerings encompass many kinds of commercial vehicles, including: agricultural machinery, construction machinery, light trucks, and military vehicles, etc. As of 2010, commercial vehicle production capacity is estimated to be around 700,000 units per year. Production capacity figures may consider engines and vehicles as discrete.

The company sells self-branded consumer products in addition to joint-venture developed vehicles under the brands of foreign manufacturers Hyundai Motor Company and the Mercedes-Benz Group. BAIC-branded military and civilian light trucks have also been produced.

Arcfox

Current Models 
Arcfox Alpha-S
Arcfox Alpha-T

Beijing

Current Models 
Beijing U5
Beijing U7
Beijing X3
Beijing X5
Beijing X6
Beijing X7
Beijing EU5
Beijing EU260
Beijing EX360
Beijing EX3
Beijing EX5
Beijing EC3
Beijing EC5
Beijing EC220
Beijing Lite R300

Beijing Off-road Vehicles (北京)

Current Models 
 Beijing BJ30
 Beijing BJ40
 Beijing BJ60
 Beijing BJ80
 BAIC BJ90
 Beijing F40

BAW

Beijing Automobile Works Co., Ltd. (BAW) is a subsidiary of BAIC based in Beijing which produces light off-road vehicles, trucks, and military vehicles.

Current Models 
BAW Yusheng
BAW Ruiling
BAW Yueling
BAIC BJ212
 BAIC BJ2020
 BAIC BJ2022
 BAIC BJ2023

Changhe

Current models 
 Changhe A6
 Changhe Freedom M50
 Changhe Freedom M70
 Changhe Q25
 Changhe Q35
 Changhe Q7

Foton

Beiqi Foton Motor Co., Ltd. (Foton Motor) is a subsidiary of BAIC which designs and manufactures trucks, buses, sport utility vehicles, and agricultural machinery. It is headquartered in Changping, Beijing.

Current Models 
 Foton Midi
 Foton Sauvana
 Foton SUP
 Foton Toano
 Foton Tunland
 Foton View
 Foton MP-X
 Foton Grand General
 Foton Gratour im6
 Foton Gratour im8
 Foton Gratour ix5
 Foton Gratour ix7

Ruili
Ruili is a sub-division of BAIC. They produce their vehicles under the Doda brand.

Current Models 
 Ruili Doda EV160
 Ruili Doda V8 (rebadged Joylong iFly)
 Ruili Doda V2 (rebadged Weiwang M20)

Former brands

Senova

BLAC 
The Beijing Light Automobile Company (BLAC), until 1988 the Beijing Automobile Factory No. 2, started in the late 1960s when production of the independently developed BJ130 began. Its introduction was slowed considerably by the upheavals of the Cultural revolution. In 1984, assembly of the Isuzu Elf/NHR began (originally as the BJ136, later as the BJ1030/1040/1050 series). In 1988, a new plant for these trucks was built with aid from the Japanese, and petrol and diesel light truck engines were also produced. BLAC went bankrupt in 2002.

Joint ventures
Like many other peers, BAIC has several joint ventures with foreign automakers—including two with Daimler AG.

Current joint ventures

Beijing Hyundai

Beijing Hyundai Motor Co., Ltd. is an automobile manufacturing company headquartered in Beijing, China, and is a 50:50 joint-venture between BAIC and Hyundai Motor Company. Established in 2002, it manufactures in Shunyi District, a satellite city of Beijing, producing Hyundai-branded automobiles for the Chinese market. New models designed for the Chinese market are due to appear.

Beijing Benz

As of 2010, Beijing Benz, a BAIC joint venture with German automaker Daimler AG, makes the Mercedes-Benz C-Class and E-Class models for sale in China and seeks to make more of the models it sells in China locally.

Beijing Foton Daimler
Beijing Foton Daimler Automobile Co., Ltd. is a joint venture between Daimler and a BAIC subsidiary, Foton Motor, which makes commercial trucks.

Huansu 

Huansu is a brand under Beiqi Yinxiang Automobile, a joint venture between Beijing Auto (Beiqi) and the Yinxiang Group from Chongqing.

Weiwang

Weiwang is a brand under Beiqi Yinxiang Automobile, a joint venture between Beijing Auto (Beiqi) and the Yinxiang Group from Chongqing.

Former joint ventures

Beijing Jeep
Beijing Jeep Corporation became China's first Sino-western automotive joint venture when it was established in 1984 with American Motors Corporation. Beijing Jeep subsequently became Beijing Benz-DaimlerChrysler Automotive Co Ltd and then Beijing Benz Automotive Co Ltd.

References

External links

(BAICIEC)  Beijing Automotive Import & Export Corporation
(BAW) Beijing Automobile Works Co., Ltd. (BAW)

 
Bus manufacturers of China
Car manufacturers of China
Government-owned transport companies
Vehicle manufacturing companies established in 1958
Chinese brands
Multinational companies headquartered in China
1958 establishments in China